MIT Solve is an initiative of the Massachusetts Institute of Technology (MIT). Solve is a marketplace for social impact innovation. Through open innovation Challenges, Solve finds tech-based social entrepreneurs all around the world. Solve then brings together MIT’s innovation ecosystem and a community of Members to fund and support these entrepreneurs to help them drive lasting, transformational impact. Currently, Solve supports 228 Solver and Fellow teams. Solve has catalyzed over $50 million in commitments for Solver teams and social entrepreneurs. 

Past Solve Challenges include Work of the Future, Frontlines of Health, Coastal Communities, and Teachers & Educators. Solve also runs a yearly Indigenous Communities Fellowship program in addition to its Black & Brown Innovators program.

Background 
Solve was born out of the Office of the President of MIT [L. Rafael Reif] in 2015, an offshoot of MIT’s mission to advance knowledge in science, technology, and other areas of scholarship that will best serve the nation and the world in the 21st century.

Method  
Each year, Solve announces new Global Challenges for which it seeks solutions. The first round of judging takes place once solution applications close. Solve staff screens all solutions submitted on its online open innovation platform and funnels strong applicants to the Challenge Leadership Group, a panel of industry leaders. The Challenge Leadership Group then selects finalists for each Challenge. Finalists are invited to a live pitch event where the most promising solutions are selected to make up that year's Solver class.

Once selected, the Solver class gains access to Solve’s community. The Solve staff helps match-make between the Solver class and leaders from the tech industry, business, philanthropy, government, and civil society who seek partnerships and opportunities to implement ideas.

Key advisors  
As of 2022, advisors for Solve include:
 David Moinina Sengeh
 Laurene Powell Jobs
 Colin M. Angle
 Ursula M. Burns
 Eric Schmidt
 Megan Smith
 Ray Rothrock
 Lubna Olayan

Events

Solve at MIT 
Solve’s annual flagship meeting takes place on MIT’s campus. Solver teams present their solutions and participate in workshops with Solve members to develop partnerships to pilot and implement solutions. The next set of Solve Challenges are also planned at this event.

The three-day event spotlights leaders from corporations, foundations, nonprofit organizations, government, academia, and the media through multiple plenary sessions.

Notable speakers at past Solve at MIT meetings include Canadian Prime Minister Justin Trudeau, Technical Advisor and Board Member of Alphabet Inc. Eric Schmidt, Cellist Yo-Yo Ma, and Senior Vice President of Amazon Alexa Tom Taylor, among many others.

The event is open to Solve members, and to the MIT community for select sessions.

Solveathon workshops  
Solveathon workshops are independently-hosted events focused on rapid ideation and refinement using Human Centered Design to brainstorm solutions to Solve’s Challenges. Solveathon workshops are spaces to form and reshape ideas, evaluate and reevaluate designs, and prototype and collaborate. Ideas developed during a Solveathon are submitted to Solve's online open innovation platform, and the team can continue working on it after the event or the ideas can inspire others.

Solveathon workshops have been hosted across the world, from Vietnam, to Ecuador, to India.

Solve Challenge Finals  
The Solve Challenge Finals are held during the United Nations General Assembly at the United Nations Headquarters in New York City. During the Solve Challenge Finals, finalists selected by Solve’s Challenge Leadership Group are invited to pitch their solutions live. Those chosen by Solve’s judges during the Challenge Finals join the Solve community as members of the Solver class.

Solver teams 
Each year, a new Solver class is selected at the Solve Challenge Finals. Notable selected Solver teams include:
 Brain Health: Emma Yang, Timeless
 Sustainable Urban Communities: Angel Adelaja, FreshDirect
 Chronic Diseases: Nightingale Health

References 

Massachusetts Institute of Technology